Peppercorn, New South Wales is a civil parish of Buccleuch County in Snowy Valleys Council, New South Wales.

Peppercorn is located at 35°33'54.0"S 148°36'04.0"E. and the nearest town is Yarrangobilly, New South Wales. Although only 35km from Canberra, the Australian capital city, the locality is rugged wilderness.

References

Parishes of Buccleuch County
Localities in New South Wales
Geography of New South Wales